The Ministry of Transport ('MOT') is a ministry in the Burmese government responsible for the country's transport infrastructure. It also operates the Myanma Airways and Myanma Port Authority. The Department of Civil Aviation is subordinate to this ministry.

Background history 
When Myanmar declared independence, the Ministry of Waterways and Civil Aviation and Ministry of Transport, Posts and Telecommunications were formed. In 1961, the above-mentioned ministries were merged and reconstituted as the Ministry of Transport and Communications with 11 organisations. In 1972, it was again reconstituted as the Ministry of Transport and Communications. It consists of 17 organisations.

In 1992, it was reconstituted into three ministries, namely Ministry of Transport, Ministry of Rail Transportation and Ministry of Communications, Posts and Telegraphs.

When the Ministry of Transport was first formed it has 4 departments, 5 enterprises and a training institute, totalling 10 organisations. The Meteorology and Hydrology Department was added to the Ministry of Transport on 20 August 1999. Myanmar Maritime University was inaugurated on 1 August 2002. Currently there are 5 departments, 5 enterprises, a university and a college, totalling 12 organisations under the Ministry of Transport.

Departments 

 Department of Civil Aviation
 Department of Marine Administration
 Department of Meteorology and Hydrology
 Directorate of Water Resources and Improvement of River Systems
 Myanmar National Airlines
 Myanma Five Star Line
 Myanma Port Authority
 Inland Water Transport
 Myanma Shipyards
 Myanmar Maritime University
 Myanmar Mercantile Marine College

Policies 
The following transport policies are laid down to fully support the economic development of the nation:
 To develop and fully utilise transport capacities to contribute towards the realisation of an economically strong, modern and developed nation.
 To fulfill transport requirements, and to extend and maintain the transport infrastructure to be able to fully support increased production from other economic sectors and meet growing public and social demands.
 To ensure smooth and secure domestic and international transport systems as well as contribute towards the development of border areas and national races and the development of tourism.
 To enable all-weather river transportation by maintenance and preservation of natural resources.
 To develop air and maritime transport infrastructures in line with international standards for environmental protection.
 To enhance the transport sector through human resources development and upgrade expertise in management and advancing modern technology.
 To abide by international conventions, acts, laws, rules and regulations with respect to the transport sector.
 To develop domestic and international transportation and actively take a key role in the implementation of a national multi-modal transport system.
 To plan for implementation of implement national, sub-regional and international transport networks.

References

External links

 Ministry of Transport

Transport
Myanmar
Transport organisations based in Myanmar